Jorge Lozano and Todd Witsken were the defending champions, but neither of them entered the event that year.Brian Garrow and Sven Salumaa won the title, defeating Nelson Aerts and Fernando Roese 7–5, 6–3, in the final.

Seeds

  Javier Frana /  Gustavo Luza (quarterfinals)
  Luiz Mattar /  Cássio Motta (first round)
  Danilo Marcelino /  Mauro Menezes (semifinals)
  Simone Colombo /  Ricki Osterthun (first round)

Draw

Draw

References
General

Doubles